The 2013 NFL season was the 94th season in the history of the National Football League (NFL) and the 48th of the Super Bowl era. The season saw the Seattle Seahawks capture the first championship in the franchise's 38 years in the league with a lopsided victory over the Denver Broncos in Super Bowl XLVIII, the league's championship game. The Super Bowl was played at MetLife Stadium in East Rutherford, New Jersey, on Sunday, February 2, 2014. It was the first Super Bowl hosted by New Jersey and the first to be held outdoors in a cold weather environment. The Seahawks scored 12 seconds into the game and held the lead the rest of the way on the back of their Legion of Boom defense.

Broncos quarterback Peyton Manning was named the regular season's Most Valuable Player (MVP) by the voters of the Associated Press (AP) for a record fifth time after compiling passing stats which included regular season records for passing yards and passing touchdowns. Manning also was named the Offensive Player of the Year for the second time in his career. Carolina Panthers linebacker Luke Kuechly earned Defensive Player of the Year honors.

Scoring reached historic levels throughout the league in 2013. As a whole the league set records for total points scored, points scored per game and the number of both touchdowns and field goals scored. The Broncos set a new standard for team scoring in the regular season with 606 points. In addition to the Broncos, ten other teams each scored over 400 points, the greatest number of teams to surpass that benchmark in a single year.

The regular season got underway on Thursday, September 5, 2013, with the Broncos hosting the defending Super Bowl XLVII champion Baltimore Ravens in the annual kickoff game. The game presaged the Broncos' historic offensive production with a strong performance by Peyton Manning in which he tied a league record in throwing seven touchdown passes and led the Broncos to a win. The regular season wrapped up on Sunday night, December 29.

The playoffs began with the wild card round which took place the first weekend of January 2014. The league's propensity for scoring did not abate in the post-season, as exemplified by the Indianapolis Colts' wild come-from-behind victory over the Kansas City Chiefs in the playoffs' opening game. The Conference Championship games featured the top seeded teams in each conference, the Seahawks in the NFC and the Broncos in the American Football Conference (AFC), hosting the San Francisco 49ers and New England Patriots respectively. Both home teams prevailed to set up just the second Super Bowl matchup of No. 1 seeds in the past 20 seasons.

Player movement
The 2013 league year began at 4 pm EST on March 12, which marked the start of the league's free agency period. For the first time the league instituted a negotiating period prior to the start of free agency during which time agents representing prospective unrestricted free agent players (though not the players themselves) were allowed to have contact with team representatives with the purpose of determining a player's market value and to begin contract negotiations. This period, which was referred to by some as the "legal tampering" period, began at midnight on March 9.

Free agency
A total of 524 players were eligible for some form of free agency. Among the high-profile players who changed teams via free agency included:

 Quarterbacks Matt Cassel (Kansas City to Minnesota), Ryan Fitzpatrick (Buffalo to Tennessee), Matt Hasselbeck (Tennessee to Indianapolis), Brian Hoyer (Arizona to Cleveland) and Kevin Kolb (Arizona to Buffalo)
 Running backs Ahmad Bradshaw (New York Giants to Indianapolis), Reggie Bush (Miami to Detroit), Shonn Greene (New York Jets to Tennessee), Steven Jackson (St. Louis to Atlanta) and Rashard Mendenhall (Pittsburgh to Arizona)
 Wide receivers Danny Amendola (St. Louis to New England), Darrius Heyward-Bey (Oakland to Indianapolis), Greg Jennings (Green Bay to Miami), Mike Wallace (Pittsburgh to Miami) and Wes Welker (New England to Denver)
 Tight ends Martellus Bennett (New York Giants to Chicago), Jared Cook (Tennessee to St. Louis), Dustin Keller (New York Jets to Miami) and Delanie Walker (San Francisco to Tennessee)
 Offensive tackles Jermon Bushrod (New Orleans to Chicago), Gosder Cherilus (Detroit to Indianapolis) and Jake Long (Miami to St. Louis)
 Guards Andy Levitre (Buffalo to Tennessee) and Louis Vasquez (Denver to San Diego)
 Defensive ends Cliff Avril (Detroit to Seattle), Michael Bennett (Tampa Bay to Seattle), Elvis Dumervil (Denver to Baltimore), Dwight Freeney (Indianapolis to San Diego) and Osi Umenyiora (New York Giants to Atlanta)
 Defensive tackles Desmond Bryant (Oakland to Cleveland), Ricky Jean-Francois (San Francisco to Indianapolis), Jason Jones (Seattle to Detroit) and Sammie Lee Hill (Detroit to Tennessee)
 Linebackers Connor Barwin (Houston to Philadelphia), James Harrison (Pittsburgh to Cincinnati), Paul Kruger (Baltimore to Cleveland) and Philip Wheeler (Oakland to Miami)
 Cornerbacks Brent Grimes (Atlanta to Miami), Keenan Lewis (Pittsburgh to New Orleans), Dunta Robinson (Atlanta to Kansas City), Dominique Rodgers-Cromartie (Arizona to Denver) and Sean Smith (Miami to Kansas City)
 Safeties Patrick Chung (New England to Philadelphia), Dashon Goldson (San Francisco to Tampa Bay), LaRon Landry (New York Jets to Indianapolis) and Glover Quin (Houston to Detroit).

Eight players were assigned the non-exclusive franchise tag by their teams, which ensured that the team would receive compensation were the player to sign a contract with another team. These players were Brandon Albert (Chiefs), Jairus Byrd (Bills), Ryan Clady (Broncos), Michael Johnson (Bengals), Pat McAfee (Colts), Henry Melton (Bears), Anthony Spencer (Cowboys) and Randy Starks (Dolphins). None of these players changed teams.

Major trades
The following trades are notable as they involved Pro Bowl-caliber players and/or draft picks in the first three rounds:

Offseason
 February 27 – The Chiefs acquired quarterback Alex Smith from the 49ers for the Chiefs' second-round pick in the 2013 draft, 34th overall (which the 49ers later traded to the Titans) and a conditional pick in the 2014 draft (which turned out to be another second-rounder, #56 overall). Smith had been the first overall selection of the 2005 NFL Draft, but had been supplanted as the 49ers starting quarterback in mid-2012 by Colin Kaepernick.

 March 11 – Wide receiver Percy Harvin was traded by the Vikings to the Seahawks for the Seahawks' 2013 first-round (#25 overall, with which the Vikings selected Xavier Rhodes) and seventh-round (pick No. 214) selections as well as the Seahawks' third-round pick in 2014 (the 96th selection). Harvin is an All-Pro and former Offensive Rookie of the Year, but he has also suffered a series of injuries throughout his career and had become disgruntled with the Vikings to the point that he asked the team to trade him. The Seahawks subsequently signed Harvin to a 6-year, $67 million contract extension which includes $25.5 million in guaranteed money.
 March 11 – The 49ers acquired wide receiver Anquan Boldin from the Ravens for a sixth-round selection in the 2013 draft (the 199th overall pick). Boldin, a three-time Pro Bowler and former Offensive Rookie of the Year, had refused to accept a pay cut that the Ravens had requested.

 April 21 – Cornerback Darrelle Revis was traded by the Jets to the Buccaneers. The Jets received the Bucs' first round draft pick in 2013, the 13th overall selection (which the Jets used to select Sheldon Richardson) and a conditional pick which would become the Bucs' fourth-round selection in 2014, the 104th overall pick. Revis, a three time All-Pro, was widely considered to be among the league's top defensive players, but he was coming off a knee injury and the Jets did not feel they would be able to retain him after the 2013 season. The Bucs signed Revis to a 6-year, $96 million contract.

In-season

 September 18 – In a bit of a shocking mid-season move the Browns traded running back Trent Richardson to the Colts in exchange for the Colts' first-round pick (26th overall) in the 2014 draft. The Browns had moved up in the previous year's draft to grab Richardson with the third overall selection and he was presumed to be a cornerstone of the team.
 October 2 – Offensive tackle Eugene Monroe was traded by the Jaguars to the Ravens in exchange for fourth- and fifth-round selections in the 2014 draft (picks #114 and #159 overall). The Jaguars had selected Monroe eight overall in the 2009 draft.

Draft

The 2013 NFL Draft was held April 25–27, 2013, in New York City. Prior to the draft the NFL Scouting Combine, where draft-eligible players were evaluated by team personnel, was held in Indianapolis on February 20–26. In the draft, the Kansas City Chiefs made Central Michigan University offensive tackle Eric Fisher the first overall selection.

Officiating changes
Dean Blandino was named as the league's new Vice President of Officiating, succeeding Carl Johnson. Referee Alberto Riveron was then promoted to the league's Senior Director of Officiating, a newly created position as a second-in-command under Blandino. Bill Vinovich, who worked the previous season as a substitute referee, was then assigned to head Riveron's former on-field officiating crew.

Rule changes
The following rule changes were approved at the NFL owners' meeting on March 20, 2013:
 The "no-challenge" rule adopted prior to the  season was modified to eliminate the automatic "no-review" penalty when a coach challenges a play that is subject to automatic review by the replay booth (turnovers, scoring plays, and any play inside of the two-minute warning). This change was prompted after last season's Thanksgiving Day game when Detroit Lions' head coach Jim Schwartz threw a challenge flag on a play where replay clearly showed Houston Texans' running back Justin Forsett's knee touched the ground, but was able to get up and score a touchdown. Due to the way the rule was written at the time the penalty for the errant challenge prevented the play from being reviewed. Under the revised rule teams will be charged a time-out (or an unsportsmanlike conduct penalty if the team is out of time-outs) when a coach throws a challenge flag on a booth-reviewable play, but the play will still be reviewed if the replay booth believes a review is necessary. This change has been referred to as the "Jim Schwartz rule".
 Making it a fumble when a player loses possession of the football while in the act of trying to bring it back to his body. This abolishes the so-called "tuck rule" which was adopted prior to the  season. Under the revised rule it will be ruled a fumble when a quarterback loses possession of the ball after a pump fake while bringing the ball back to his body.
 Tight ends and H-backs will now be permitted to wear uniform numbers 40-49 as well as 80–89. Previously the two positions were treated separately with tight ends allowed to wear only 80-89 and H-backs limited to wearing 40–49.
 "Peel-back" blocks will now result in 15-yard personal foul penalties anywhere on the field. Previously, these type of blocks were permitted within the tackle box.
 On field goal and extra point attempts, long snappers will now be considered defenseless players. In addition, defensive players are prohibited from blocking low at the snap of a scrimmage kick.
 For field goal and extra point attempts the defensive team can have no more than six players on either side of the ball at the snap (5 yard penalty), and players cannot push teammates into blockers (15 yard penalty).
 Any player at least three yards downfield or outside of the "tackle box" who leads with his helmet on a hit will be penalized 15 yards for unnecessary roughness. If both offensive and defensive players lead with helmets on the same play, both will be penalized.

Player safety changes
Once players start the season with properly fitted helmets that they are comfortable wearing, the league's Head, Neck, and Spine Committee recommended that players should not switch helmets in mid-season, especially to ones that have not been broken in yet. To comply with these new rules, teams will be allowed to change or remove the decals on their regular helmets for such uniforms.
All players (except for punters and kickers) were required to wear thigh and knee pads. It was previously mandatory to wear these pads from  through .

Preseason
Training camps for the 2013 season opened in late July. The Buccaneers camp was the first to open with rookies reporting on July 17. The Cowboys were the first to open camp to veteran players on July 20. All teams were in camp by July 27.

Prior to the start of the regular season, each team played at least four preseason exhibition games. The preseason schedule got underway with the Pro Football Hall of Fame Game on Sunday, August 4. The Hall of Fame game is a traditional part of the annual Pro Football Hall of Fame induction weekend celebrating new Hall of Fame members. It was played at Fawcett Stadium in Canton, Ohio, which is located adjacent to the Hall of Fame building. In the game, which was televised nationally on NBC, the Dallas Cowboys defeated the Miami Dolphins 24–20. The 2013 Hall of Fame class of Larry Allen, Cris Carter, Curley Culp, Jonathan Ogden, Bill Parcells, Dave Robinson and Warren Sapp was honored during the game. The 65-game preseason schedule concluded on Thursday, August 29.

Regular season
The 2013 season featured 256 games played out over a seventeen-week schedule which began on the Thursday night following Labor Day. Each of the league's 32 teams played a 16-game schedule which included one bye week for each team between weeks four and twelve. The slate featured seventeen games on Monday night including a doubleheader in the season's opening week. There were also seventeen games played on Thursday, including the National Football League Kickoff game in prime time on September 5 and three games on Thanksgiving Day. The regular season wrapped up with a full slate of 16 games on Sunday, December 29, all of which were intra-divisional matchups.

Scheduling formula
Under the NFL's scheduling formula, each team played each of the other three teams in their own division twice. In addition, a team played against all four teams in one other division from each conference. The final two games on a team's schedule were against the two teams in the team's own conference in the divisions the team was not set to play who finished the previous season in the same rank in their division (e.g. the team which finished first in its division the previous season would play each other team in their conference that also finished first in its respective division). The pre-set division pairings for 2013 were as follows:

The 2013 regular season schedule was released on April 18, 2013.

Regular season highlights
The 2013 regular season began on Thursday, September 5, with the NFL Kickoff Game in which the Denver hosted the Baltimore. The game was a rematch of a two-overtime playoff game of the previous season and broadcast on NBC. The Ravens, as the reigning Super Bowl champions, would normally have hosted the kickoff game, however, a scheduling conflict with their Major League Baseball counterparts, the Baltimore Orioles, forced the Ravens to start the season on the road (the Ravens' and Orioles' respective stadiums share parking facilities). The Ravens became the first Super Bowl winner since  to open their title defense on the road. The Broncos defeated the Ravens 49–27 on the strength of a record-setting performance by quarterback Peyton Manning. Manning completed 27 of 42 pass attempts for 462 yards and seven touchdowns. Manning set or tied numerous league records in the game including most touchdown passes in a game (tied with five others) and records for most career games with at least six, five and four touchdown passes.

There were two NFL International Series games held at Wembley Stadium in London. On September 29, the Minnesota defeated the Pittsburgh 34–27. On October 27, the San Francisco defeated the Jacksonville 42–10. This season was the first of a four-year agreement for the Jaguars to play a home game in London (an agreement which was later extended an additional four years).

The San Diego and Oakland played an unusual late night game in the season's fifth week on October 6. The game, originally scheduled to start at 1:25 pm PDT, had to be moved to the evening to accommodate stadium schedules – Major League Baseball's Oakland Athletics, co-tenants of O.co Coliseum, had hosted the Game 2 of the 2013 American League Division Series the previous night and stadium crews needed nearly 24 hours to convert the stadium from a baseball to a football configuration. O.co Coliseum was only multi-purpose stadium which hosted both an NFL and an MLB team in 2013. Although the stadium conversion was complete by 3:30 pm local time, an 8:36 pm kickoff was necessary to avoid conflict with NBC's Sunday Night Football, where the San Francisco hosted the Houston at Candlestick Park across the San Francisco Bay. The Chargers-Raiders game was the latest start time for a game in NFL history and was broadcast nationwide on the NFL Network.

The league's traditional slate of Thanksgiving Day games was played on Thursday, November 28. The Detroit hosted the Green Bay in the early game at 12:30 pm EST, marking the Packers' 21st Thanksgiving game in Detroit. The Oakland visited the Dallas in the late afternoon game at 3:30 pm CST. The evening game featured the defending Super Bowl champion Baltimore hosting their AFC North rival Pittsburgh at 8:30 pm EST.

The Buffalo hosted the Atlanta in Toronto, Ontario, Canada on December 1. The game was played at Rogers Centre one week after the 101st Grey Cup ended the 2013 Canadian Football League season. On January 9, the Bills and Rogers Communications had announced a five-year extension of the Bills Toronto Series.

In-season scheduling changes
The following regular season games were moved either by way of flexible scheduling, severe weather, or for other reasons:

Week 5: The San Diego–Oakland game was moved from 4:25 p.m. ET to 11:35 p.m. ET. The Raiders' Major League Baseball counterparts, the Oakland Athletics, hosted Game 2 of the 2013 American League Division Series on the previous night (October 5), and officials at O.co Coliseum needed almost 24 hours to convert the stadium from a baseball to a football configuration (O.co Coliseum was the last venue to host both an NFL and an MLB team before the Raiders moved to Las Vegas). The later start time also avoided a conflict with NBC's Sunday Night Football, where San Francisco hosted Houston at Candlestick Park across the San Francisco Bay at 8:40 p.m. ET. Additionally, the Chargers–Raiders game was televised on the NFL Network instead of CBS.
Week 7: The Houston–Kansas City game was moved from 1:00 p.m. ET to 4:25 p.m. ET.
 Week 11: The Kansas City–Denver game, originally scheduled as CBS's only late 4:05 p.m. ET singleheader game, was flexed into the 8:30 p.m. ET slot on NBC Sunday Night Football. CBS originally selected this matchup as one of their "protected games" from flex-scheduling, but later allowed the league to flex it so it could be seen by a national audience. The original Sunday night contest, the Green Bay–New York Giants game, was then moved back to the 4:25 p.m. ET doubleheader time slot on Fox, while the San Diego–Miami game was moved from 1:00 p.m. ET to the 4:05 p.m. ET singleheader slot.
 Week 13: The Denver–Kansas City game was moved from 1:00 p.m. ET to 4:25 p.m. ET, while the New England–Houston game was switched from 4:25 p.m. ET to 1:00 p.m. ET.
 Week 14: The Carolina–New Orleans game, originally scheduled at 1:00 p.m. ET on Fox, was flexed into the 8:30 p.m. ET time slot on NBC. The original Sunday night contest, the Atlanta–Green Bay game, was then changed to 1:00 p.m. ET on Fox. It was the second time the Packers were stripped of a prime-time appearance this season, large in-part due to an injury sustained to Aaron Rodgers.
 Week 15: The New Orleans–St. Louis and Arizona–Tennessee games were moved from 1:00 p.m. ET to 4:25 p.m. ET.
 Week 16: The Chicago–Philadelphia game, originally scheduled at 1:00 p.m. ET on Fox, was flexed into the 8:30 p.m. ET time slot on NBC. Although the original Sunday night contest, the New England–Baltimore game, featured two playoff contending teams, it was moved to 4:25 p.m. ET to allow CBS to also air a more competitive game.
Week 17: The Philadelphia–Dallas game, originally scheduled at 1:00 p.m. ET, was selected as the final NBC Sunday Night Football game, which for the third consecutive season decided the NFC East division champion. The Buffalo–New England game was moved to the 4:25 p.m. ET time slot on CBS while the Green Bay–Chicago game (which decided the NFC North division champion) and Tampa Bay–New Orleans game were moved to 4:25 p.m. ET on FOX.

Regular season standings

Division

Conference

Postseason

Wild card round
The wild card round of the playoffs featured the two wild card playoff qualifiers from each conference being hosted by the two lowest seeded divisional winners. The top two seeds in each conference – the Seahawks, Panthers, Broncos and Patriots – all had first-round byes. The games were played January 4–5, 2014.

The weekend's first game on Saturday featured the Colts staging the second biggest comeback in playoff history to defeat the Chiefs by a score of 45–44. The 28-point second half deficit the Colts overcame is exceeded only by the Bills–Oilers playoff game from January 1993 which has become known simply as "The Comeback." It was the first time in any NFL game (regular or postseason) that a team won in regulation play (i.e. not overtime) after having trailed by as many as 28 points. The game was also the highest scoring postseason game to have been decided by a one-point margin as well as the first game in league history to finish with a 45–44 result. The Colts and Chiefs combined to gain 1,049 total yards which established a new single-game postseason record, breaking the record of 1,038 yards that was set by the Bills–Dolphins first-round game on December 30, 1995, and matched in a Saints–Lions first-round matchup on January 7, 2012. The loss was the Chiefs' eighth straight in the playoffs which broke an NFL record for consecutive playoff losses the franchise had previously shared with the Lions.

The Saints beat the Eagles 26–24 in the Saturday night game. It was the Saints' first ever road playoff victory. The Saints built an early 20–7 lead before the Eagles bounced back to take a 24–23 lead with less than five minutes remaining in the game. However, the Saints worked their way down the field while also working the clock on the game's final drive before Shayne Graham kicked the game-winning field goal from 32 yards out as time expired.

The early game on Sunday was the only game of the weekend not decided by three or fewer points with the Chargers defeating the Bengals, 27–10. Bengals quarterback Andy Dalton committed three second-half turnovers which led to the Chargers scoring 20 unanswered points to overcome a 7–10 halftime deficit. The Bengals loss marks a league record third straight year in which the team has lost its playoff opener, and extended the Bengals' streak of playoff futility to 23 seasons. Every other current NFL team has won a playoff game since the Bengals' last playoff victory in January 1991.

In the late afternoon game on Sunday the 49ers defeated the Packers 23–20 on a brutally cold day at Lambeau Field. Quarterback Colin Kaepernick, who eschewed sleeves and gloves despite the chilly conditions, passed for 227 yards and rushed for 98 more to lead the 49ers to victory in a back-and-forth game. Phil Dawson kicked the winning field goal as time expired. This was the second straight year that the Packers' season had both started and ended with losses to the 49ers.

Divisional round
The divisional round games were played on January 11–12, 2014 and three of the four were rematches of regular season games – only the Patriots and Colts had not met in 2013.

In the early game on Saturday, the Seahawks defeated the Saints 23–15. The Seahawks held a 16–0 lead at halftime, but the Saints came back in the second half to make the game interesting. The Seahawks were able to hold on after a late Saints comeback effort, including an onside kick recovery, fell short. The Seahawks' offense centered around a 28 carry, 140 yard rushing effort from Marshawn Lynch, who also scored on a 31-yard run in the fourth quarter.

Patriots running back LeGarrette Blount and the Patriots defense were the stars of the Patriots 43–22 victory over the Colts in the Saturday night game. Blount rushed for 166 yards and a franchise-record four touchdowns while Colts quarterback Andrew Luck was intercepted four times. Patriots quarterback Tom Brady broke a league record for most playoff games for a starting quarterback with 25 (a record he had previously shared with Brett Favre) and extended his own record of 18 career playoff wins. The victory allowed the Patriots to reach the AFC Championship game for the third straight year as well as the eighth time with Brady and head coach Bill Belichick. Belichick moved into a second-place tie with Don Shula on the all-time postseason head coaching wins list, one victory behind Tom Landry.

The 49ers defeated the Panthers by a score of 23–10 in the early Sunday game. The 49ers defense twice stopped the Panthers one yard short of the end zone and also recorded two interceptions and five quarterback sacks. 49ers quarterback Colin Kaepernick threw for one touchdown and ran for another in the game. The win put the 49ers into their third straight and fifteenth overall conference championship game, matching the Pittsburgh Steelers for most conference championship appearances. Jim Harbaugh became the first head coach in NFL history to take his team to the conference championship game in each of his first three seasons.

In the final game of the divisional round the Broncos beat the Chargers 24–17. It was only the fourth time in the season to date that the Broncos had been held to fewer than 30 points (three of which were against the Chargers), but the Chargers offense could not capitalize. The Broncos held a 17–0 lead in the fourth quarter before the Chargers launched a comeback that was too little and too late. The win put the Broncos into the AFC championship game for the first time since the 2005 season.

Conference championships

The conference championships took place on Sunday, January 19, 2014.

The early game featured the Broncos hosting the Patriots in the AFC Championship Game. The game was referred to by many as Manning-Brady XV as it was the fifteenth meeting (the fourth in the playoffs) of the two starting quarterbacks, Tom Brady and Peyton Manning. The Broncos defeated Brady and the Patriots 26–16 behind a 400-yard passing performance by Manning. Manning led the Broncos on two long touchdown drives where each used over seven minutes of game time and were the two longest drives in terms of game time of the Broncos season. This was Manning's third career postseason game with 400 or more yards passing, equaling Drew Brees for the most such playoff games in league history. Broncos head coach John Fox, who previously led the Carolina Panthers to Super Bowl XXXVIII in 2004, became the sixth head coach in NFL history to take two different franchises to the Super Bowl.

The NFC Championship Game had the Seahawks hosting the 49ers in the late game. The Seahawks defense forced three turnovers in the fourth quarter which proved to be the difference in the game. The last of these was a pass intended for Michael Crabtree in the endzone which was intercepted by Seahawks linebacker Malcolm Smith off a deflection by cornerback Richard Sherman with just 22 seconds remaining in the fourth quarter. The interception preserved a 23–17 Seahawks victory. In an on-field interview immediately after the game with Fox sideline reporter Erin Andrews, Sherman famously directed a rant at Crabtree whom Sherman called a "sorry receiver."

Super Bowl XLVIII
Super Bowl XLVIII featured the top seeded team from each conference for just the second time in twenty years. The Broncos possessed the league's best offense (in terms of both scoring and yards) while the Seahawks had the league's top defense (also in both scoring and yardage). The game was played on February 2, 2014 at MetLife Stadium in East Rutherford, New Jersey, just outside New York City and was televised in the U.S. by Fox with kickoff at 6:32 pm EST. This was the first ever Super Bowl to be staged outdoors in a cold weather environment although the temperature was a mild 49 degrees at kickoff.

The game started disastrously for the Broncos who, despite losing the coin toss, received the opening kickoff. On the game's first play from scrimmage from the Broncos' 14 yard line, Broncos center Manny Ramirez sent a shotgun snap over the head of quarterback Peyton Manning. The ball traveled into the endzone where it was covered by Broncos running back Knowshon Moreno who was touched down for a safety with just 12 seconds of game time elapsed. This was the quickest score ever in a Super Bowl. The Seahawks did not relinquish the lead in a 43–8 victory.

Seahawks linebacker Malcolm Smith, who scored on a 69-yard interception return plus had a fumble recovery and tallied 10 tackles, was named the game's Most Valuable Player (MVP).

This was the fifth Super Bowl loss for the Broncos, the most for any franchise. Even in defeat, though, Peyton Manning's record-breaking year continued. He set a record for most passes completed in a Super Bowl with 34. He also moved ahead of Tom Brady into first place on the career playoff passing yardage list with 6,589 yards. In addition, Broncos wide receiver Demaryius Thomas caught 13 passes to set a single-game Super Bowl record.

Playoffs bracket

Pro Bowl

The Pro Bowl is the league's all-star game. The league had raised doubts about the future of the exhibition due to concerns over the game's competitiveness in recent years, but on March 20, it was announced that the 2014 Pro Bowl would indeed take place, receiving a one-year reprieve. As in recent years, the game was held the week before the Super Bowl at Aloha Stadium in Honolulu, Hawaii. It was played on Sunday, January 26, and broadcast in the U.S. on NBC.

The format for the game was considerably altered in an effort to improve competitiveness. The biggest changes included an "unconferenced" format in which players would be selected regardless of the conference in which their team competes, a draft format to select the teams and various tweaks to increase the excitement of the game itself. Deion Sanders and Jerry Rice served as the non-playing captains for the two competing squads.

Notable events
Some NFL-related events that made headlines throughout 2013 include:
Harris Poll tabs professional football as America's favorite sport
A nationwide poll conducted by Harris Interactive in December 2013 concluded that pro football is the favorite sport of Americans. Of the respondents asked the question, "If you had to choose, which ONE of these sports would you say is your favorite?", 35% chose pro football. That is up by one percentage point over the results of the previous year. Football has taken the top spot in the annual poll each year since it was first conducted in 1985. Baseball finished second, with 14% naming it as their favorite, followed by college football at 11%.

Aaron Hernandez charged with murder
In August, former Patriots tight end Aaron Hernandez was charged with the murder of Odin Lloyd. Hernandez was released by the Patriots following his arrest in the murder investigation in June. In an effort to further distance themselves from the troubled Hernandez, the Patriots offered fans an opportunity to trade-in Hernandez jerseys for another jersey of comparable value. Hernandez would be convicted of the murder charge and sentenced to life imprisonment in April 2015.

Riley Cooper incident
Eagles wide receiver Riley Cooper was caught on video using a racial slur during a music concert. After the video went viral during the team's training camp, Cooper was briefly sent away from the team to seek counseling. The Eagles also levied an undisclosed fine.

Concussion litigation brought by former players
In August, just prior to the start of the season, a  settlement proposal was announced in a class-action lawsuit brought against the league by former players who contended that the league concealed a link between head injuries sustained by players and traumatic brain injury which may only become apparent later in life. The judge in the case later rejected the settlement on the grounds that the amount may not be large enough to cover the needs of all the plaintiffs.

Buccaneers release quarterback Josh Freeman in mid-season
In October, the Buccaneers released quarterback Josh Freeman after trying unsuccessfully to trade him. Despite being just 25 years old, Freeman held franchise records for touchdowns and completions and was second in passing yardage. It had come out earlier in the week that Freeman had been in the league's substance abuse program; Freeman described his participation as voluntary and a result of prescription drugs he was taking to treat ADHD. Shortly after his release, Freeman was signed by the Vikings. Freeman started for the Vikings in week seven, but he posted a passer rating of just 40.6 in that game and did not play another down during the season. He was inactive for nine of the Vikings' final ten games.

Tampa Bay MRSA outbreak
Three Buccaneers players – kicker Lawrence Tynes, guard Carl Nicks and cornerback Johnthan Banks – were diagnosed with methicillin-resistant Staphylococcus aureus (MRSA) infections during the season. The potentially deadly strain of staph had been encountered by other NFL teams including the Washington Redskins, St. Louis Rams and Cleveland Browns in previous seasons. After the third infection was confirmed there was brief discussion as to whether the Bucs' week six home game against the Eagles would be played, but the decision was made to continue with the scheduled game. The Falcons even took the step of bringing in a hazardous materials crew to disinfect the visitor's locker room after the Bucs' visited Atlanta in week seven.

Dolphins bullying scandal
Dolphins offensive lineman Richie Incognito was suspended by the team in November after allegations surfaced that he bullied fellow lineman Jonathan Martin who left the team earlier in the season due to the impact of Incognito's actions.

The league's official investigation into the matter concluded that Martin and other Dolphins employees had been subjected to a "pattern of harassment" at the hands of Incognito as well as fellow linemen John Jerry and Mike Pouncey. The 144-page report, written by league-appointed investigator Ted Wells, called the situation a "classic case of bullying". The report also implicated Dolphins offensive line coach Jim Turner in some of the abuse; Turner was fired by the team shortly after the report's release.

Redskins shut down quarterback Robert Griffin III for season's final three games
Redskins head coach Mike Shanahan made a decision to bench the team's franchise quarterback, Robert Griffin III for the team's final three games of the 2013 season. Griffin had undergone knee surgery after being injured the previous season in which he was named NFL Offensive Rookie of the Year after being selected second overall in the 2012 draft. Griffin was much less productive in his second season. Shanahan stated that the decision to start Kirk Cousins over Griffin was made to protect Griffin from sustaining another injury, although there was speculation that Shanahan was unhappy about Griffin's friendly relationship with team owner Daniel Snyder. Shanahan was fired after the season ended.

Seahawks quarterback Russell Wilson leads all players in licensed product sales
Russell Wilson the second-year quarterback of the Super Bowl champion Seahawks led all NFL players in terms of total licensed product sales (jerseys, T-shirts, figurines, photos, etc.) made from March 2013 through February 2014. The top six players on the list were quarterbacks, including, in order, Peyton Manning (who held the top spot the previous year), Colin Kaepernick, Robert Griffin III, Aaron Rodgers and Tom Brady. The only non-quarterback in the top 10 was Wilson's Seahawks teammate, running back Marshawn Lynch.

Deacon Jones' death

Legendary Hall of Fame defensive lineman Deacon Jones died in June. Shortly thereafter the league honored Jones' legacy by creating the "Deacon Jones Award" to be given annually to the player who records the most quarterback sacks. Colts linebacker Robert Mathis was the inaugural winner of the honor.

Bud Adams' death
Tennessee Titans owner Kenneth S. "Bud" Adams died in October. He was the only owner the franchise, which began in 1960 as the Houston Oilers in the AFL, has ever had. Adams was a second-generation oil tycoon who made his home in Houston, Texas. The team was inherited in equal parts by the families of Adams' three children with Adams' son-in-law Tommy Smith succeeding Adams as the president and CEO of the franchise.

Other 2013 deaths
Aside from those mentioned above, the following people associated with the NFL died in 2013:

Records, milestones, and notable statistics

The 2013 season saw a number of league records set, most notably:*A record 11,985 points were scored during the season, with games averaging 46.8 points, the highest average in NFL history (46.5 in ).
A total of 1,338 total touchdowns were scored, surpassing the league-wide record of 1,297, which occurred last season.
A record 863 field goals were made this year, surpassing the record set last year with 852. Also, kickers converted a record 86.5% of their field goal attempts breaking the record of 84.5% set during the  season.
With 5,477 passing yards, Peyton Manning broke Drew Brees'  record for passing yards in a season by a single yard.
In scoring 606 points during the regular season, the Denver Broncos surpassed the NFL record for most points (previously held by the 2007 Patriots, who scored 589 points) and became the first team to eclipse the 600 point threshold. The Broncos outscored the next highest scoring team (the Chicago Bears) by 161 points, or more than ten points per game.
A total of eleven teams scored at least 400 points this season, breaking the record of nine teams in 2008 and 2012.
Andrew Luck of the Indianapolis Colts surpassed Cam Newton of the Carolina Panthers most passing yards through two seasons in an NFL career. He finished with 8,196 yards in his first two seasons.
The Denver Broncos became the first team in NFL history to have five players score at least ten touchdowns in the same season: Demaryius Thomas (14), Knowshon Moreno (13), Julius Thomas (12), Eric Decker (11) and Wes Welker (10). No team had previously had more than three such players.
Tom Brady led the Patriots to his eleventh division title as the team's starting quarterback, setting the mark for the most division titles for a starting quarterback. Peyton Manning led his team to the tenth division title of his career, which is the second most all time.
Andre Johnson, of the Houston Texans, reached 100 catches for his fifth season which ties him with Wes Welker for the league record for the most seasons with 100+ receptions.
Peyton Manning set a record for most touchdown passes without an interception to start a season with 20. Later in the season, Nick Foles of the Philadelphia Eagles nearly matched the mark by starting the season with 19 touchdowns before throwing an interception, which is the second longest such streak in league history.

Week 1
On September 5, Peyton Manning of the Denver Broncos set or tied five NFL passing records against the Baltimore Ravens:
Seven touchdown passes tied record for most in a game.
Set record of three career games throwing six or more TDs.
Tied Drew Brees' record of four career games throwing five or more TDs.
Tied Brett Favre's record of 23 career games throwing four or more TDs.
Extended his own record with his 73rd 300-yard passing game.
The four safeties recorded in Week 1 tied a league record for most in an opening week of games.

Week 2
Peyton Manning became just the third quarterback in NFL history to throw for 60,000 yards in a career, joining Dan Marino (61,361 career passing yards) and Brett Favre (71,838). Manning achieved the mark in his 226th game, making him the fastest to the milestone.

Week 4
Placekicker Blair Walsh of the Minnesota Vikings set an NFL record by making his 12th straight 50+ yard field goal. Walsh had previously shared the record with Robbie Gould and Tony Zendejas. He also broke the Vikings' franchise mark for field goals of 50 or more yards which had been held by Ryan Longwell.
Detroit Lions quarterback Matthew Stafford set two NFL records in the first half of the Lions' week four game against Chicago: he became the first quarterback in league history to complete more than 1,200 passes in his first 50 games and he also broke Kurt Warner’s league record for most yards thrown in his first 50 games with a total of 13,976 yards.

Week 5
Peyton Manning of the Broncos threw 20 touchdown passes before he threw his first interception of the season to set an NFL record for the longest such streak at the start of a season. The previous record of 16 was set by Milt Plum of the Cleveland Browns in 1960. Manning's 20 touchdown passes through five games are also a league record. In addition, the 414 yards passing Manning compiled bring his career total to 61,371 eclipsing Dan Marino for second place on the career passing yardage list behind only Brett Favre.
Oakland's Charles Woodson scored the 13th return touchdown off of a turnover of his career, which ties a league record also held by Darren Sharper and Rod Woodson.

Week 6
Chicago Bears placekicker Robbie Gould tied an NFL record (set in week 4 by Blair Walsh) by making his twelfth consecutive field goal attempt of 50 or more yards.
The Denver Broncos and Kansas City Chiefs each won to become the last two remaining undefeated teams at 6–0, making this just the second time since the introduction of the division format in  that two teams from the same division have maintained perfect records through six games. Both the Broncos and Chiefs play in the AFC West. The only other pair of teams to have achieved this feat are the  Chicago Bears and Detroit Lions which each made it to 10–0.
Indianapolis Colts wide receiver Reggie Wayne caught five passes to become just the ninth player in league history with 1,000 receptions. With 1,001 career receptions Wayne is currently in eighth place on the all–time list for receptions. The Colts became the first franchise to have two players reach the milestone of 1,000 receptions: Wayne and Marvin Harrison. Wayne was the third fastest player to reach the mark, doing so in his 195th game. Only Harrison and Jerry Rice caught 1,000 passes in fewer games.

Week 7
Cowboys quarterback Tony Romo made his 100th career start. The 27,485 passing yards he has compiled are the most by a player through 100 starts in league history.
Kick returner Devin Hester of the Bears returned a punt for a touchdown. This score extended his NFL records in regular season punt return TDs (13) and combined punt or kick return TDs (19) while also moving him past Deion Sanders for the record of most career return TDs of any type, including playoff games (20).

Week 8
Vikings kick returner Cordarrelle Patterson set a league record for the longest kickoff return at 109 yards. This return also ties the record for longest play of any type.
Raiders quarterback Terrelle Pryor had a 93 yard touchdown run which set an NFL record for the longest run by a quarterback. He also set a team record for the longest run from scrimmage.
Wide receiver Larry Fitzgerald of the Cardinals caught four passes for 48 yards and a TD, as the Cardinals beat the Falcons. He reached the 800–reception level in the win becoming the youngest player in the history of the league to catch 800 passes. Fitzgerald was 30 years and 57 days old on Sunday.

Week 9
The Miami Dolphins, 22–20, overtime home win over the Cincinnati Bengals marked just the third time in league history a game ended with a safety.
Quarterback Nick Foles of the Philadelphia Eagles tied the NFL record for the most touchdown passes in a game with seven against the Oakland Raiders. He is the first player to accomplish this feat while attaining a perfect passer rating for the game of 158.3.

Week 10
Peyton Manning, with his win over the Chargers in San Diego, now holds the record for most career road wins by a quarterback with 74. The record was previously held by Brett Favre who compiled a 73–76 road record compared to 74–42 for Manning as of this game.
The New Orleans Saints set an NFL record for most first downs in a game by achieving 40 first downs against the Dallas Cowboys in their 49–17 victory.

Week 11
Washington linebacker London Fletcher played in his 250th consecutive game in the Redskins' 24–16 loss at Philadelphia, joining Jim Marshall, Brett Favre and Jeff Feagles as just the fourth player to accomplish this. It was also his 209th consecutive start, breaking Tampa Bay's Derrick Brooks' record for the longest streak by a linebacker in NFL history.
Tom Brady became the sixth player in NFL history to reach 4,000 career passes completed.

Week 12
Larry Fitzgerald, of the Arizona Cardinals, became the youngest player in NFL history to reach 11,000 yards receiving.  Fitzgerald was 30 years, 85 days.  Randy Moss had previously held the record at 30 years, 222 days.
Linebacker Robert Mathis of the Colts recorded his 40th strip/sack against the Cardinals. This set a new record, passing Jason Taylor for most strip/sacks in NFL history.
The Green Bay Packers and Minnesota Vikings played to a 26–26 tie after overtime at Lambeau Field. This was the first overtime game to end with no winner in which the overtime period was not scoreless (the regulation score was 23–23).

Week 13
Browns wide receiver Josh Gordon became the first player in NFL history to gain 200+ receiving yards in each of two consecutive games.
Alshon Jeffery, of the Chicago Bears, recorded 12 catches for 249 yards and two touchdowns.  This, along with Josh Gordon's game, marked the first time in NFL history two players had at least ten catches for 200 yards and two touchdowns on the same day.
With his 211–yard rushing effort against the Chicago Bears, Adrian Peterson of the Vikings breached the 10,000–yard mark for his career. He became the third fastest NFL player to reach 10,000 yards.  Peterson accomplished this feat in his 101st career game.  Eric Dickerson (91 games) and Jim Brown (98 games) reached this mark in fewer games.
Tom Brady's second touchdown pass on Sunday was the 353rd of his pro career, all for the Patriots under Bill Belichick. That broke the NFL record for career TD passes under a particular head coach; Dan Marino threw 352 TD passes under Don Shula.
Adam Vinatieri, of the Indianapolis Colts, kicked five field goals (47, 48, 45, 37, 49) against the Tennessee Titans.  With this, Vinatieri accomplished the following: joined Morten Andersen as the only players in NFL history to score at least 800 points for two teams, tied Jason Elam’s league record with a 16th season with at least 100 points and tied an NFL record shared by nine players with four field goals from 40–49 yards.

Week 14
Matt Prater, of the Denver Broncos, kicked a 64–yard field goal to set a record for the longest field goal in league history. The previous record of 63 yards had stood since  and was shared by Tom Dempsey, Jason Elam, Sebastian Janikowski and David Akers.
Saints quarterback Drew Brees passed for 313 yards in the victory against the Carolina Panthers, becoming just the fifth player in league history to surpass 50,000 yards passing. Brees reached the milestone in the fewest games (183). The other players to have achieved that level are Peyton Manning (191 games), Dan Marino (193), Brett Favre (211), and John Elway (229).
With his seventh game of the year with four or more touchdown passes, Peyton Manning set an NFL record for most such games in a season.

Week 15
All teams on Sunday combined to score 763 points which set a new league single-day scoring record surpassing the 759 points scored on January 1, 2012.
Jamaal Charles, of the Kansas City Chiefs, became the first running back in NFL history with four touchdown catches in one game. He also scored once on a run and no other player, regardless of position, had four touchdown catches and a touchdown run in a single game.
Tony Gonzalez became the first tight end and the fifth player overall in NFL history to reach 15,000 receiving yards with his 62 yards against the Redskins. He currently has 1,313 catches, 15,008 yards and 110 touchdowns. Only Gonzalez and Jerry Rice have surpassed 15,000 receiving yards, 1,100 catches and 100 touchdowns in a career.
Calvin Johnson had 98 yards receiving during the week which gave him 5,094 yards since the beginning of the  season. He became the first player in NFL history to record 5,000 yards in a three-season span.
Justin Tucker tied an NFL record for longest field goal in a dome with his game-winning 61 yard field goal. He also converted from 24, 29, 32, 49 and 53 yards in scoring every point of the Ravens' 18–16 victory over the Lions. In doing so, Tucker became the first player to make field goals from the 20s, 30s, 40s, 50s and 60s in a single game.

Week 16
Panthers linebacker Luke Kuechly recorded 24 tackles against the Saints which ties a record set by David Harris in 2007 for the most tackles recorded in a single game (since tackles became an official stat in ).

Week 17
The defending Super Bowl champion Baltimore Ravens  lost to the Cincinnati Bengals and were eliminated from post-season contention in week 17, thus ensuring there would be no repeat champion. The last team to defend their title were the 2004 New England Patriots, who won Super Bowls XXXVIII and XXXIX. This marks a tie for the longest period between repeat winners in Super Bowl history. The other longest stretch without a back-to-back champion is the period between the Pittsburgh Steelers' wins in Super Bowl XIII and Super Bowl XIV and the San Francisco 49ers' victories in Super Bowl XXIII and Super Bowl XXIV. The Ravens became the fifteenth Super Bowl winner to fail to make the playoffs in the following season, which includes six of the past 12 defending champions.

Playoff records/milestones
Wildcard weekend
The Indianapolis Colts' defeat of the Kansas City Chiefs included the second biggest comeback in NFL playoff history when the Colts erased a 28-point third quarter deficit – the only playoff game where a team came back from further down was the Bills–Oilers game from January 1993 which has become known simply as "The Comeback." It was the first time in any NFL game (regular or postseason) that a team won in regulation play (i.e. not overtime) after having trailed by as many as 28 points. The game was also the highest scoring postseason game to have been decided by a one-point margin as well as the first game in league history to finish with a 45–44 result.
The Colts and Chiefs combined for 1,049 total yards which established a new single-game postseason record, breaking the record of 1,038 yards that was set by the Bills–Dolphins first-round game on December 30, 1995, and matched in a Saints–Lions first-round matchup on January 7, 2012.
The Chiefs' eighth consecutive postseason loss broke the NFL record the franchise had previously shared with the Lions.

Division weekend
Patriots quarterback Tom Brady eclipsed Brett Favre's record for most playoff starts by a quarterback with his 25th postseason start. He also extended his own record for playoff victories by a starting quarterback to 18.
Patriots coach Bill Belichick moved into a second-place tie with Don Shula on the all-time postseason head coaching wins list, one victory behind Tom Landry.
Patriots running back LeGarrette Blount scored four rushing touchdowns, placing him second all time to Ricky Watters (who ran for five touchdowns in a 1994 game) in both rushing as well as total touchdowns in a playoff game. With 166 rushing yards, Blount became the first player in NFL history to rush for at least 125 yards and four touchdowns in a postseason game.
The 49ers defeated the Panthers to reach the franchise's third straight and 15th overall Conference Championship game, matching the Pittsburgh Steelers for most Conference Championship appearances. Jim Harbaugh became the first head coach in NFL history to take his team to the Conference Championship game in each of his first three seasons.

Championship weekend
With the Broncos 26–16 victory over the Patriots, John Fox became the sixth head coach in NFL history to lead two different franchises to the Super Bowl. He previously coached the Carolina Panthers in Super Bowl XXXVIII.
Broncos quarterback Peyton Manning recorded his third career postseason game with 400 or more yards passing, equaling Drew Brees for the most such playoff games in league history.

Super Bowl
The Seattle Seahawks recorded the quickest score in Super Bowl history when Cliff Avril tackled Denver Broncos running back Knowshon Moreno in the endzone after a fumbled shotgun snap with just 12 seconds elapsed in the contest. The Seahawks would maintain a lead throughout the game leading to a record for the longest time holding a lead (59 minutes, 48 seconds) in Super Bowl history.
The Broncos set the record for most Super Bowl losses with five.
The Seahawks' defeat of the Broncos marked the first time in NFL history that a game ended with a 43–8 score.
Peyton Manning set a Super Bowl record for passes completed with 34.
Manning threw for 280 yards to pass Tom Brady and move into first place on the career playoff passing yardage list with 6,589 yards.
Demaryius Thomas caught 13 passes to set a single-game Super Bowl record.

Regular season statistical leaders

Awards and statistics

Individual season awards

The 3rd Annual NFL Honors, saluting the best players and plays from 2013 season, was held on February 1, 2014, at Radio City Music Hall in New York City.

All-Pro team

The following players were named first team All-Pro by the Associated Press:

Players of the week/month
The following were named the top performers during the 2013 season:

Team statistical leaders
Offense
Most points scored: Denver, 606 points (37.9 points/game)
Fewest points scored: Jacksonville, 247 points (15.4 points/game)
Most total offense: Denver, 7,317 yards (457.3 yards/game)
Least total offense: Tampa Bay, 4,432 yards (277 yards/game)
Most total passing: Denver, 5,444 yards (340.3 yards/game)
Least total passing: Tampa Bay, 2,820 yards (176.3 yards/game)
Most rushing: Philadelphia, 2,566 yards (160.4 yards/game)
Least rushing: Atlanta, 1,247 yards (77.9 yards/game)

Defense
Fewest points allowed: Seattle, 231 points (14.4 points/game)
Most points allowed: Minnesota, 480 (30 points/game)
Fewest total yards allowed (defense): Seattle, 4,378 yards (273.6 yards/game)
Most total yards allowed (defense): Dallas, 6,645 yards (415.3 yards/game)
Fewest passing yards allowed: Seattle, 2,752 (172 yards/game)
Most passing yards allowed (defense): Philadelphia, 4,636 yards (289.8 yards/game)
Fewest rushing yards allowed (defense): Arizona, 1,351 yards (84.4 yards/game)
Most rushing yards allowed (defense): Chicago, 2,583 yards (161.4 yards/game)

Head coach/front office changes

Head coach
Offseason

In-season
The following head coaches were replaced in-season:

Front office
Offseason

Attendance

Notes
 – Played one home game in Toronto, Ontario, Canada.
 – Played one home game in London, England.

Stadium changes

2013 marked the final season in which the Minnesota Vikings played their home games at the Hubert H. Humphrey Metrodome, as the team moved temporarily to TCF Bank Stadium (home of the University of Minnesota Golden Gophers) while their U.S. Bank Stadium was built at the same site as the Metrodome. The Vikings played the 2014 and 2015 seasons at TCF Bank Stadium and opened their new stadium for the 2016 season. The Vikings had called the Metrodome home since it opened in 1982.

The 49ers had played in Candlestick since 1971 and the stadium hosted Monday Night Football 36 times, including the stadium's farewell game on December 23. No other facility had as many Monday Night Football appearances. With the departure of the 49ers, Candlestick Park was left without any permanent tenants. On February 3, 2013, plans to demolish Candlestick Park were announced and took place after the final 2013 49ers game.

Two stadiums received new naming rights: In January 2013, Cleveland Browns Stadium was renamed FirstEnergy Stadium. The FirstEnergy Corporation, an energy company based in Akron, Ohio, agreed to pay the Cleveland Browns $6 million per year for 17 years to have its name on the team's stadium. In July 2013, Cowboys Stadium was re-branded as AT&T Stadium, though terms of the naming rights deal remain undisclosed.

Uniforms
Several teams made changes to their uniforms or logos prior to the 2013 season:

 The Jacksonville Jaguars revised their logo and unveiled a new uniform design. The new design includes all black home uniforms, white road jerseys and a teal alternate jersey. The new jerseys include "claw marks" on the shoulders and a "JAGS" patch over the heart. The new helmet design features a paint scheme that fades from matte black in the front to gold in the back.
 The Miami Dolphins updated their logo and unveiled redesigned uniforms. The new logo features a more streamlined dolphin which loses the football helmet and the "fierce" facial expression. The new uniforms keep the same basic color palette, but there is less use of orange. The facemask color on the team's new helmets has been changed from aqua to white.
 The Minnesota Vikings introduced a slightly tweaked "Norseman" logo and unveiled new uniforms. The colors are barely changed, with a new font for the uniform numbers and asymmetrical stripes on the pants. The new helmets feature matte purple paint with glossy logos and black facemasks.
 The San Diego Chargers introduced some relatively minor uniform alterations. The most noticeable change is the switch to "self-color" collars (where the collars match the jersey body) from the previous contrasting color "neck roll" collar design. There were also some changes to the colors used on the nameplates as well as some changes to the socks. The pants and helmets remain unchanged.
 The New York Giants introduced a new alternate uniform consisting of new white pants which may be worn with the team's existing blue jerseys in place of the usual grey pants. The team wore this new alternate uniform on November 10 against the Oakland Raiders and November 24 against the Dallas Cowboys.
In honor of the fifteenth anniversary of the team's relocation to Nashville, the Tennessee Titans wore their alternate navy blue jerseys in two home games. This marked the first time since  that the Titans wore the navy blue jerseys which were their primary home jerseys in their early Tennessee seasons before they switched to their current light blue jerseys. The Titans also added a patch commemorating the 15th season in Tennessee to their jerseys.
The Indianapolis Colts added a jersey patch which celebrates the team's 30th season in Indianapolis.

Due to a new recommendation that a player should use the same helmet for all games, several teams were forced to make changes in their plans to use alternate and throwback jerseys, including the following:
 The Tampa Bay Buccaneers shelved their "Creamsicle" throwback uniforms completely. The Patriots similarly chose not to wear their throwback uniforms at all in 2013.
 The Washington Redskins wore their current helmets (with the center stripe decal removed) along with their throwback uniforms which feature a different shade of burgundy.
 The Green Bay Packers also wore their current helmets with their throwback uniforms, but with the stripes and logo decals removed.
 The Dallas Cowboys decided to wear their blue "away" jerseys at their Thanksgiving Day home game, something they have not done since the 1960s. Traditionally the team has worn their throwback jerseys (which include a white helmet) for the Thanksgiving game.

U.S. television coverage
This was the eighth and final year of the television contracts with CBS, Fox, NBC, and ESPN before the new nine-year contracts began in 2014. CBS and Fox continued to carry the Sunday afternoon AFC and NFC packages, respectively. NBC carried Sunday Night Football, the kickoff game, and the prime-time Thanksgiving game; and ESPN aired seventeen Monday Night games in sixteen weeks.

References

Further reading

 
2013